Hansamu Yama Pranata (born 16 January 1995) is an Indonesian professional footballer who plays as a centre-back for Liga 1 club Persija Jakarta and the Indonesia national team.

Club career

Barito Putera
On 21 October 2014, Hansamu signed a three-year contract with Barito Putera to commence ahead of the 2015 Indonesia Super League. He made his debut on 4 April 2015 as starting line-up, which ended 2–0 victory against Persela Lamongan. On 10 September 2017, Hansamu scored his first official league goal for Barito Putera in a 2–0 win over Sriwijaya at the 17th May Stadium. On 21 September 2017, He scored in 53rd minute and saved Barito Putera from losing to Persipura Jayapura, score draw 1–1.

In January 2019, Barito Putera management announced that Hansamu will not renew his contract for next season, due to family reasons, he will move to Mojokerto, because he will marry his girlfriend and live there.

Persebaya Surabaya
On 16 January 2019, Hamsamu signed a one-year contract with Persebaya Surabaya on a free transfer. On 16 February 2019, Hansamu made his first appearance in the Round of 32 2018–19 Piala Indonesia in an 8–0 home win against Liga 3 club Persinga Ngawi. and made his league debut for Persebaya on 16 May in a lost 2–1 against Bali United.

On 29 February 2020, Hansamu scored his first goal for Persebaya in a 1–1 draw over Persik Kediri at the Gelora Bung Tomo Stadium. After that, one month later, This season was suspended on 27 March 2020 due to the COVID-19 pandemic. The season was abandoned and was declared void on 20 January 2021.

Bhayangkara
On 5 May 2021, Hansamu signed a one-year contract with Bhayangkara to commence ahead of the 2021–22 Liga 1. He made his league debut on 29 August 2021 as starting line-up, which ended 2–1 victory against Persiraja Banda Aceh. On 31 October 2021, Hansamu scored his first league goal for the club in Liga 1, opening the scoring in a 0–1 won against Persikabo 1973. 

On 20 February 2022, he scored the opening goal in a 4–0 win over Persikabo 1973; the latter result saw Bhayangkara move to 2nd position in the league table. During the 2021–22 season, he made 19 league appearances and scored 2 goals for Bhayangkara.

Persija Jakarta
Hansamu signed for Persija Jakarta to play in Liga 1 in the 2022–23 season. He made his league debut on 31 July 2022 in a match against Persis Solo at the Patriot Candrabhaga Stadium, Bekasi.

On 15 January 2023, he scored his first league goal for the club from header in a 3–2 win over Bali United, he was also selected as man of the match in that match.

International career 
Hansamu made his debut for the Indonesia U-23 on 10 February 2015 against Syria U-23 in the friendly. 

Hansamu made his debut for the senior team on 3 December 2016 against Vietnam in the 2016 AFF Championship and opened the scoring with a header from a corner kick in the seventh minute in an eventual 2–1 win. On 14 December 2016, he scored the winning goal against Thailand in the 70th minute and Indonesia win 2–1 against Thailand.

Hansamu was included in the final 23-man squad for the 2022 AFF Championship by Shin Tae-Yong.

Career statistics

Club

International

International goals 
International under-23 goals

International senior goals

Honours

Club
Persebaya Surabaya
 Indonesia President's Cup runner-up: 2019
 East Java Governor Cup: 2020

International
Indonesia U-19
 AFF U-19 Youth Championship: 2013

Indonesia U-23
 Southeast Asian Games bronze medal: 2017

Indonesia
 AFF Championship runner-up: 2016
 Aceh World Solidarity Cup runner-up: 2017

Individual
 Liga 1 Best Eleven: 2018

References

External links 
 
 

Indonesian footballers
1995 births
Living people
People from Mojokerto
Sportspeople from East Java
Javanese people
Indonesia youth international footballers
Indonesia international footballers
PS Barito Putera players
Persebaya Surabaya players
Bhayangkara F.C. players
Persija Jakarta players
Liga 1 (Indonesia) players
Association football defenders
Southeast Asian Games bronze medalists for Indonesia
Southeast Asian Games medalists in football
Footballers at the 2018 Asian Games
Competitors at the 2017 Southeast Asian Games
Asian Games competitors for Indonesia